The Azerbaijan national under-17 football team represents Azerbaijan in association football at the under-17 youth level, and is controlled by the Association of Football Federations of Azerbaijan.

Competition history
In 2014, the team, under the management of Mirbaghir Isayev, managed to qualify for the Elite Round of the 2015 UEFA European Under-17 Championship qualification stage due to being one of the best third-placed teams in the first qualification round. The team also qualified for the 2016 UEFA European Under-17 Championship after being selected as hosts.

UEFA European Football Championship record

Under-16 format

Under-17 format

*Denotes draws include knockout matches decided on penalty kicks.

Performance in recent competitions

Group 9

Results
2016 UEFA European Under-17 Championship

2017 UEFA European Under-17 Championship qualification

2018 UEFA European Under-17 Championship qualification

2019 UEFA European Under-17 Championship qualification

Current squad
 The following players were called up for the 2023 UEFA European Under-17 Championship qualification matches.
 Match dates: 24-30 October 2022
 Opposition: ,  and 
Caps and goals correct as of: 12 October 2021, after the match against

Coaching staff

Manager history
 Nicolai Adam (2014)
 Mirbaghir Isayev (2014–2015)
 Tabriz Hasanov (2015–2016)
 Vugar Mammad (2016)
 Mirbaghir Isayev (2017)
 Ramin Guliyev (2018)
 Vugar Mammad (2019–present)

Former squads
UEFA European Under-17
2016 UEFA European Under-17 Football Championship squads - Azerbaijan

Achievements 
 Winner of President's Cup Kazakhstan: 2011
 3rd of Caspian Cup: 2011
 2nd of Caspian Cup: 2012
 2nd of Caspian Cup: 2013

See also
 Azerbaijan national football team
 Azerbaijan national under-23 football team
 Azerbaijan national under-21 football team
 Azerbaijan national under-20 football team
 Azerbaijan national under-19 football team
 Azerbaijan national under-18 football team

References

External links 
 Azerbaijan Football Federation Association

European national under-17 association football teams
Under-17
Youth football in Azerbaijan
National, under-17